Fenisorex (INN, USAN, BAN) is an amphetamine-like anorectic drug which does not appear to have ever been marketed.

References

Anorectics
Monoamine releasing agents
Stimulants
Fluoroarenes
Heterocyclic compounds with 2 rings
Oxygen heterocycles
Secondary amines